Timochares ruptifasciatus, the brown-banded skipper, is a butterfly of the family Hesperiidae. It is found in southern Texas, Mexico and Jamaica.

There are several generation with adults on wing from March to November in southern Texas and Mexico.

The larvae feed on Malpighia glabra. Adults feed on flower nectar.

External links
Butterflies and Moths of North America

Butterflies of North America
Butterflies described in 1884
Erynnini